Wazi Abdul Hamid (born 1971) is a veteran motorcycle cub prix rider from Malaysia, winning the 1996 125 cc. Underbone championship. He retired from the motorcycle racing industry in December 2006 and recently, he opened a pocket bike racing course in Taman Desa near Desa Waterpark in Kuala Lumpur together with Shahrol Yuzy. The racing course is known as Yuzywazi Race Course.

Career highlights

2000s
2000 8th Overall - Malaysian Cub Prix Championship (Expert)
3rd Overall - FIM Asia Road Racing Championship (Underbone 110cc)
2001 9th Overall - Malaysian Cub Prix Championship (Expert)
2nd Overall - FIM Asia Road Racing Championship (Underbone 110cc)
2002 8th Overall - Malaysian Cub Prix Championship (Expert)
3rd Overall - FIM Asia Road Racing Championship (Underbone 125cc)
2003 2nd Overall - Malaysian Cub Prix Championship (Expert)
2nd Overall - FIM Asia Road Racing Championship (Underbone 125cc)
2004 8th Overall - Malaysian Cub Prix Championship (Expert)
3rd Overall - FIM Asia Road Racing Championship (Underbone 125cc)
2005 2nd Overall - Malaysian Cub Prix Championship (Expert)

1990s
1994 2nd Overall - Malaysian Cub Prix Championship (Novice)
1995 2nd Overall - Malaysian Cub Prix Championship (Expert)
1996 CHAMPION - Malaysian Cub Prix Championship (Expert)
4th Overall - Asia Pacific Road Racing Championship (Underbone 110cc)
1997 7th Overall - FIM Asia Road Racing Championship (Series Production 250cc)
1998 5th Overall - Malaysian Cub Prix Championship (Expert)
1999 5th Overall - Malaysian Cub Prix Championship (Expert)
5th Overall - FIM Asia Road Racing Championship (Underbone 110cc)

In popular culture
Wazi made an appearance in Remp-It (2006) as the original owner of a Yamaha RX-Z which is lent to a Mat Rempit named Madi.

References

1971 births
Living people
Malaysian people of Malay descent